William Holingbroke, alias Holyngbourne (died c. 1400), of New Romney, Kent, was an English politician.

He was a Member (MP) of the Parliament of England for New Romney in 1381, October 1383, November 1384, February 1388 and September 1388.

References

14th-century births
1400 deaths
English MPs 1381
People from New Romney
English MPs October 1383
English MPs November 1384
English MPs February 1388
English MPs September 1388